DJMax Portable 2 (DJMAX Portable 2, DMP2; Korean: 디제이맥스 포터블 2) is a music video game published and developed by Pentavision, for the PlayStation Portable which was released on March 30, 2007. This is the second installment of the DJMax Portable series. While the first installment, DJMax Portable, never reached distribution outside of South Korea until the release of DMPi, DJMax Portable 2 was released in Japan along with English packaging and manuals.

Features
DJMax Portable 2 contains new songs, new difficulties, new modes, as well as a few returning tracks from DJMax Portable. A 5-button mode has been included along with a Fever mode and an Easy mode. DJMax Portable 2 can be linked with songs from the DJMax Portable game using a new play system called Link Disk mode. There are also unlockable O.S.T. tracks from the game including Korean, Japanese and English versions of the songs which are played via the soundtrack mode. The game also includes remote control support— using the inline controller with the official PSP headphones, you can control the music in this mode. Customizable control configurations are also included in DJMax Portable 2 allowing you change what the buttons do. Multiplayer is available using the PSP's Ad hoc connection.

Song list
There are 61 playable songs in DJMax Portable 2, 45 of which are available at the start. 15 more songs are unlockable for play via various methods, and the final remaining song (Your Own Miracle, the title song for Portable 2) is only playable under certain circumstances.

A few songs are playable only in 5B. Generally these songs were in Portable 1 (which didn't have a 5B mode).

Songs that require an unlock are marked with (**).

Limited Edition Package
Limited Edition packages were released in Korea containing:
DJMax Portable 2 (PlayStation Portable Game)
DJMax Portable 2 Orpheus Box ~Night Black~
DJMax Portable 2 Audio Trinity (3CD)
DJMax Portable 2 Visual Artbook (64 pages)
DJMax Portable 2 Jigsaw Puzzle (500 pieces)
DJMax Portable 2 Visual Postcard Set (16 pieces)

See also
 DJMax
 DJMax Portable

External links
 Official Website

References

Video games developed in South Korea
2007 video games
Portable 2
PlayStation Portable games
PlayStation Portable-only games
South Korea-exclusive video games
Music video games
Turntable video games